An academic year or school year is a period of time which schools, colleges and universities use to measure a quantity of study.

School holiday

School holidays (also referred to as vacations, breaks, and recess) are the periods during which schools are closed or no classes or other mandatory activities are held. The dates and periods of school holidays vary considerably throughout the world, and there is usually some variation even within the same jurisdiction. Governments often legislate on the total number of school days for state schools. The holidays given below apply to primary and secondary education. Teaching sessions (terms or semesters) in tertiary education are usually longer.

Terminology

Spring vacation 
In countries with a Christian religious tradition, the Easter holiday, which in the United States is sometimes known as spring break, is a holiday that takes place in the northern spring. The date varies mainly because Easter is a movable feast, but also by country and level of schooling.

Summer vacation 
In the northern hemisphere, the longest break in the educational calendar is in the middle of the year, during the northern summer, and lasts up to 14 weeks. In Ireland, Italy, Latvia, Lithuania, and Russia, summer holidays are normally three months, compared to six to eight weeks in Britain, the Netherlands, and Germany. In the southern hemisphere, the longest break in the educational calendar is in the end-beginning of the year, during the southern summer, and lasts up to 14 weeks, from December 21 to March 20.

Common practices and effects
Summer holidays for most children are a time to relax, enjoy themselves, catch up on studies, or spend time with family or relatives. Many families travel together on school holidays.

School holidays have many effects on a country, ranging from the price of travel and holiday accommodation, which increase as demand increases while children are off school, to a change in crime rate: Example UK crime rate monthly figures. Traffic congestion and heavy passenger loads on public transport on school run routes may be worse on school days during term time. The number of families taking holidays away from urban areas can reduce traffic and use of public transport in cities while loading long-distance highways and means of transport.

In some countries, i.e. Netherlands, where many families travel to their holiday destinations, the start and end dates of school holidays in different regions are staggered to reduce the heavy traffic and pressure on means of transport that would otherwise occur on these dates.

By country

Africa

Nigeria
In Nigeria, the longest holiday is from mid-July to second week of September for secondary schools and a longer duration within same period for tertiary institutions. Holidays are basically determined by schools and they start from June to early days in September.

South Africa
In South Africa, the main holiday usually lasts from early December to early or mid-January (4 or 6 weeks). There is an autumn break of up to 2 weeks in late March or early April, a longer winter break in late June and early July, and a spring break in late September or early October.

South African schools and universities are all closed on all South African public holidays. In terms of Public Holidays Act if the holiday fall on a Sunday then the schools are closed the next Monday.

Americas

Brazil
In Brazil, summer holidays start in early December and end in late January or early February. Winter holidays are generally the entire month of July. Some schools in the tropical north follow a different school year. The Brazilian Carnival is 40 days before Easter Sunday and those dates are not school holidays.
Brazilian schools must have at least 200 school days. Some national and Catholic holidays are usually celebrated in 3 or 4 days, like Easter, Corpus Christi and Carnival.

Canada
In Canada, the school year typically lasts between 185 and 190 days. The summer holiday includes the months of July and August, with students returning to school in late August or early September, most commonly on the day after Labour Day. The winter break lasts for two weeks (sometimes a day or two longer), beginning on Saturday and encompassing Christmas Day and New Year's Day. The spring break is one to two weeks long depending on the city or province. Good Friday and Easter may or may not fall within spring break. The Thanksgiving break is a 3-day break that falls in mid-October.
 In Ontario, the school year is regulated to last at least 194 days, with up to seven of those days being professional activity days (P.A. days), for a total minimum of 187 instructional days. Spring break (commonly known as March Break) is the third week in March.

Chile
The school year is divided into semesters. The first semester runs from late February or early March to July. Following a two-week or three-week winter break, school resumes and lasts until early or mid-December, followed by 10–12 weeks of summer vacations. In addition, schools have a one-week-long break for National Holidays in mid-September. Being located in the Southern Hemisphere, spring begins approximately at the end of this holiday week so it acts similarly to the American spring break. There is also a brief Easter break in March or April.

Mexico
In Mexico, school usually ends in the second week of July and resumes the third week of August depending on what scheduling system a school uses, and whether it is high school or college. Christmas holiday is two weeks. Also there is the Easter recess which lasts for two weeks.

United States
In the United States, there are typically 160-180 school days in a year; the exact number mainly depends on the state. (although school years at colleges and universities are often shorter). Private schools tend to have classes for 170 days each year.

Here are the school holidays/breaks in the US (with the four main breaks underlined):

Event-based
 Thanksgiving/Fall Holiday or Break – Occurs at the end of November. This holiday usually consists of the week of Thanksgiving – the day before Thanksgiving, Thanksgiving Day, and the day after. Some areas have the Monday and Tuesday of the Thanksgiving week as regular days and take Wednesday as an early dismissal day; with Thanksgiving and the day after off. Other schools take the whole week off and have an early release on the Friday before the break. US Thanksgiving is on the fourth Thursday of November (occurs between November 22 and November 28), while Black Friday is on Friday after fourth Thursday of November (occurs between November 23 and November 29).

US Thanksgiving depends on date, between November 22 and November 28:
 If the year ends on Sunday, Thanksgiving is on November 23, while Black Friday is on November 24.
 If the year ends on Monday, Thanksgiving is on November 22, while Black Friday is on November 23.
 If the year ends on Tuesday, Thanksgiving is on November 28, while Black Friday is on November 29.
 If the year ends on Wednesday, Thanksgiving is on November 27, while Black Friday is on November 28.
 If the year ends on Thursday, Thanksgiving is on November 26, while Black Friday is on November 27.
 If the year ends on Friday, Thanksgiving is on November 25, while Black Friday is on November 26.
 If the year ends on Saturday, Thanksgiving is on November 24, while Black Friday is on November 25.
 Christmas or Winter Break – Varies in length per school; usually starts at the third Saturday in December and ends a day or two after New Year's Day (sometimes the first Monday after the New Year's Day), unless New Year's Day falls on a Sunday in which case the first Monday (January 2) is the official holiday and schools may not begin until January 3; the most recent occurrence of this was in the 2022-23 holiday break when January 1, 2023 fell on a Sunday. 
 Martin Luther King Day – Martin Luther King Day is always on the third Monday of January each year. Some students have a full or half-day Friday and have the weekend, Martin Luther King day, and sometimes Monday and Tuesday off. The certain day of Martin Luther King Day depends on the dominical letter of the year:
 If the year is a common or leap year starting on Sunday, Martin Luther King Day is on January 16.
 If the year is a common or leap year starting on Monday, Martin Luther King Day is on January 15. 
 If the year is a common or leap year starting on Tuesday, Martin Luther King Day is on January 21.
 If the year is a common or leap year starting on Wednesday, Martin Luther King Day is on January 20.
 If the year is a common or leap year starting on Thursday, Martin Luther King Day is on January 19.
 If the year is a common or leap year starting on Friday, Martin Luther King Day is on January 18.
 If the year is a common or leap year starting on Saturday, Martin Luther King Day is on January 17.
 Spring or Easter Break – Usually lasts for one or two weeks in March or April 
 Columbus Day or Indigenous Peoples' Day Break – Columbus Day is always the second Monday in October. Many schools take a week off, though some areas only take Columbus Day itself off. In many states, however, Columbus Day is not observed as a school holiday at all. Also called Indigenous Peoples' Day. The certain date of the Columbus Day depends on the dominical letter of the year:
 If the year is a common year starting on Sunday or a leap year starting on Saturday, Columbus Day is on October 9.
 If the year is a common year starting on Monday or a leap year starting on Sunday, Columbus Day is on October 8.
 If the year is a common year starting on Tuesday or a leap year starting on Monday, Columbus Day is on October 14.
 If the year is a common year starting on Wednesday or a leap year starting on Tuesday, Columbus Day is on October 13.
 If the year is a common year starting on Thursday or a leap year starting on Wednesday, Columbus Day is on October 12.
 If the year is a common year starting on Friday or a leap year starting on Thursday, Columbus Day is on October 11.
 If the year is a common year starting on Saturday or a leap year starting on Friday, Columbus Day is on October 10.

Season-based
It is often believed that when the United States was a primarily agrarian society, children were needed during the Northern Hemisphere summer months for farm labor.

However, there is little evidence supporting this, with 19th-century rural schools more typically favoring a summer academic term and more vacation time during spring and autumn.

Summer is still a popular time for family vacations, and most have a two or three-month summer vacation. The academic year typically runs from August or early September until the end of May or early June, depending on the length of the year and number of the holiday, vacation, and snow days occurring during the year. The year is divided into two semesters, three trimesters or four quarters, typically with a report card issued to students' parents at the end of each.

An academic year typically includes a fall and spring semester, with a shorter optional summer session. Many also have a short optional winter session. Some operate on a trimester calendar.

Continuing education classes (often available at community colleges and private "boot camp" style schools) are often shorter and start throughout the year with no particular seasonality.

 October Break – Usually lasts for one week in October (in the week of Columbus Day). See Columbus Day above.
 Mid-Winter or February Break – One week in February (usually at or around President's Day) or March (depending on the region).
 Spring Vacation or Break – See Easter Break above.
 Summer Vacation or Break – Lasts for about 11–16 weeks, starting anywhere from late May to late June, and ending anywhere from late August to the day after Labor Day in early September. This often depends on the region – for example, most schools in the Northeastern United States end in June and start just after Labor Day, while the majority of schools in the Southern U.S. have schools end in May and start again in August.
 Teacher's Day off – Exists in some school districts, being two to three days at any time in school calendar
 Inservice day(s) – Scheduled breaks for teachers to participate in in-season training or discussions, or to attend the state or national conventions held by a teacher's union.
 All federal and state holidays – That includes religious holidays, such as Good Friday, and sometimes Jewish and Islamic holidays, depending on school demographic.

Note: Often in charter schools breaks are shorter due to the extended number of days students spend in school (200 days vs. 180 days for standard public schools).

College breaks

Colleges and universities vary widely. Some closely follow the K-12 break schedule, others have the same but longer breaks to accommodate students who live farther away and wish to return home for holidays. Most colleges and universities have the following breaks:

 Thanksgiving/Fall Break – end of November (The week of Thanksgiving – 3 days before Thanksgiving, Thanksgiving Day, and the day after – the Friday before the break is considered a half-day).
 Winter Break – mid-December to late January
 Spring Break – a week or two in March or April (usually starting on Good Friday)
 Summer Break – Early/mid-May to between late August and the day after Labor Day in September (usually lasting about 12–18 weeks).

Most colleges and university years are divided into two semesters.
The first starting from the beginning of the year (August/September) until mid-December, and the second lasting from January until early May. Winter and summer classes could be taken in between the breaks.

Duration
Public elementary and secondary schools averaged (at the state level) between 170 and 180 school days in the 2007–08 academic year. Different states have different legal minimum requirements for instructional days and hours per year.

Asia

China
Summer holidays usually last from early July to end of August. The winter holiday usually lasts 1 month, and its time varies depending on the date of the Chinese New Year.

Hong Kong
In Hong Kong summer holidays last from mid-July to the end of August. Christmas, Lunar New Year and Easter holidays last usually for one and a half weeks.

India

South India
In South India, summer vacations last from the end of March or early April to the beginning or middle of June.

The Diwali break begins in either October or November, depending on the month Diwali occurs in that year. It lasts for about one week or two days. Christmas break starts on the last week of December (22nd or 23rd) and ends on the first week of January (5th) or might last for only two days and a one-day break for the New Year. The festivals Dusherra and Sankranti are also given holidays for half a month or four days.

In Tamil Nadu, one day leave is given for Deepavali. Tamil Nadu celebrates Pongal festival(Thai Pongal): It is a four-day festival which, according to the Tamil calendar, is usually celebrated from January 14 to January 17.

North India

In north India, the typical summer vacation runs from mid-May to the end of June, school starting from July 1 usually.

Navaratri break is usually for 10 days, and Dusherra lies in the middle.

Christmas holidays are not usually given, however, some schools combine the Christmas holidays with the winter break. Schools in Uttar Pradesh give a holiday on Charan Singh's birth anniversary, and that's when the winter break starts for some. For some other schools the winter break starts on 28 December, and usually ends on the second weekend of the new year.

Most of India

There are many public holidays in India, depending on the region. Certain holidays are mandated across the nation.

January 26 : Republic Day

August 15 : Independence Day

October 2 : Gandhi Jayanti (Birthday of Mahatma Gandhi)

UAE (United Arab Emirates)
Main holidays

The following are breaks usually seen in Dubai schools but other emirates also sometimes follow the Dubai holidays:

Summer Break: Summer holiday is usually from the end of June/first of July to the end of August/first week of September.

Diwali Break: Indian festivals like Diwali (October/November) are also given a holiday or two, which becomes the Autumn break in the UAE.

Winter Break: The winter break usually lasts for three weeks from the beginning/middle of December to the beginning of January which also includes the new year’s holiday.

Spring Break: Spring break is for two-to-three weeks from the end of March until early-to-mid April.

New semester: This break is given according to the board of the school like as in schools with an ICSE Board have a holiday in the first or the first two week(s) of April while in CBSE it happens in another time of the year, likely after the summer break.

Other Islamic occasions are celebrated by a holiday or a short break like the Eid break.

This information is relevant as of 2019.

Indonesia
In Indonesia, there are four main school holidays:
 New school year holiday – known as libur kenaikan kelas (up-grading holiday), which usually takes place for 2–3 weeks between late June and early July. Dates may vary, depending on each province/region. The holiday starts from Monday of the first week to the Saturday of the last week of the break.
 Mid-term holiday, is a break that aims to separate the two semesters of the Indonesian school year. It takes place for two weeks between late December and early January, coinciding with Christmas and New Year holidays. The starting and ending dates are the same as the new school year holiday.
 Eid al-Fitr holiday (or lebaran holiday), which lasts for around two weeks. The date varies according to the Islamic calendar.
 Fasting Holiday / Ramadhan Holiday (or puasa holiday), which lasts for about 1 month. The date varies according to the Islamic calendar. This break mostly coincides with the Eid al-Fitr holiday. School usually starts on the first Monday of the new month. It can potentially last 3–4 months if the new school year holiday (libur kenaikan kelas) happens before or during the month of Ramadan. But, if Christmas occurs after the holiday of Eid al-Fitr, school will start in the new year. On the first day after the break, the students and teachers will apologise to each other and shake hands, known as "Halal Bihalal" this period lasts about 3 days, and after Halal Bihalal, parents will receive a "rapot" or a grade report which shows student achievement over the past year.

Besides the main holidays, there are many small holidays which take place for 1–2 days, such as Independence Day, religious breaks, and Teacher's Day.

Israel 
In Israel, the academic year is divided into two semesters. The first one begins in October (depending on the Hebrew calendar. Mostly a week or two after Simchat Torah), and it ends 13 weeks after in January. Then the next six weeks of January and February are dedicated to the first semester exams. Afterwards, in late February or early March, begins the second semester until mid- or late June. When the months of June and July are dedicated to the second semester exams while late testing can be by middle of August.

Japan 
In Japan, the new academic year starts on the second week of April. In most schools in Japan, there are four main breaks: two weeks from late March to early April (Spring), about a month from late July to the end of August (Summer), the Health & Sports Day weekend (Fall), and two weeks over the year-end and New Year period from late December to early January (Winter). There are some exceptions in northern Japan, where schools set a longer winter break, while cutting the summer one shorter. Additionally, there are 4 national holidays falling between 29 April and 5 May, sometimes called "Golden Week."

Colleges/universities have the following breaks:

 Summer/Fall break: Early August to early October
 Winter break: Late December to early January
 Spring break: Early February to early April

Korea
In Korea, the school year starts at the beginning of March. Until 2015, schools followed a three-term system, similar to Japan:

 Term 1: Early March to mid/late July
 Summer break: Approximately 1 month
 Term 2: Mid/late August to late December (with a brief 3-5 day Chuseok/Fall break interrupting this term)
 Winter break: Approximately 1 month
 Term 3: 2 weeks in February
 Spring break: Approximately 2 weeks

From 2015 onwards, the calendar was changed to a more quasi-Western styled one, having the year to end on January rather than February. 

 1st quarter: March to early May
 Spring break: Approximately 1 week
 2nd quarter: Early/mid May to mid/late July
 Summer break: Approximately 1 month
 3rd quarter: Mid/late August to late September
 Chuseok/Fall break: Approximately 1 week
 4th quarter: October to early January
 Winter break: Approximately 2 months

Colleges/universities get the following breaks:

 Children's Day/Spring break: May 5
 Summer break: Mid-late June to August 31
 Chuseok/Fall break: 3–5 days in late September
 Winter break: Mid-late December to February 28/29

Malaysia
In Malaysia, there are 2 main semester holiday and an additional of mid-term break and year end holiday. The mid-year holidays last for two weeks, from late May until mid-June, in between the two school terms. The year-end holidays last for six weeks, from mid-November until early January, in between two school years. Each school term has a mid-term break; one week in March for the first semester and one week in the months of August or September (variable) for the second semester.

Schools are closed on national and state public holidays. Schools are allowed to have a few special holidays without replacement for events such as school anniversary and sports day. For festivities such as Hari Raya Puasa, Chinese New Year and Deepavali, schools usually apply for additional holidays to allow longer breaks for students to visit relatives in their hometowns. However, every day missed exceeding the special holiday allowance would be replaced by having classes on weekends.

Philippines
In the Philippines, until 2020 there were three breaks: summer break (at the end of the 4th quarter) started from the late March or early April and usually ended in June, semestral break (at the end of the 2nd quarter) started from late October ending in early November, and Christmas break (at the end of the 3rd quarter) lasted from mid-December to early January. After the 1st quarter the National Heroes' Day weekend, a 3-day long weekend including the last Monday of August, was also taken. Since 2020, the summer or mid-year break begins from early June till late August and is also known as the Independence Day break as Independence Day, June 12, now falls during the mid year vacation. With the move of the calendar for most schools, an additional break, Easter break was added, corresponding to Holy Week up to Easter Sunday. The other vacation breaks remain as usual. However, the school year has begun shifting back to its original June-March model as the pandemic has gradually calmed down at least for many public schools.

For universities and colleges, the four breaks in their collegiate calendar closely match those of the national basic education calendar until 2022. Since 2016-17, most of these higher learning institutions begin their year in August or September, matching the Western calendar.

Event-based holidays are declared by the President (for national holidays) and the provincial governor or city mayor for local holidays through the Department of Education (DepEd) for Basic Education and Commission on Higher Education (CHED) for colleges and universities.

Singapore
In Singapore, there are four school terms. Terms 1 and 2 are referred to as Semester 1, as terms 3 and 4 are referred to as Semester 2. Each term consists of ten school weeks. Term 1 starts the day immediately after New Year's Day. If the first school day is a Thursday or a Friday, it is not counted as a school week. After term 1, there is a break of a week, called the March Holidays. Thereafter, term 2 commences and is followed by a break of four weeks, the June Holidays. It is followed by term 3, after which there will be another break of one week, the September Holidays. Then, term 4 would start, and after it there is the December holidays, which would be either five or six weeks long, depending on whether the first week of the year was counted as a school week. Students are also given days off on public holidays, as well as Children's Day, Youth's Day, Teacher's Day and the day after National Day.

Turkey

All public schools have following holidays:

 January 1 – New Year
 Winter Break (also called Midterm Break or 15 Day Break) – two weeks in late January or early February
 April 23 – National Sovereignty and Children's Day
 May 1 – Labour and Solidarity Day
 May 19 – commemoration of Atatürk, Youth and Sports Day
 Summer Break – 13 weeks from early-mid-June to mid-September
 August 30 – Victory Day (coincides with Summer Break most of the time)
 October 29 – Republic Day (28 October is half day)

There are Ramadan Feast (3 days) and Sacrifice Feast (4 days) holidays, but exact dates of these holidays change every year because Ramadan & Sacrifice Feasts are calculated according to Muslim calendar, resulting these feasts to be celebrated earlier by 10 or 11 days each year. If these feasts are at the middle of the week, then the break becomes a full week break with the Arafah (the day before the feast) day also included in the break.

Starting from 2019, the Summer Break has been cut to 11 weeks and the following two breaks have been introduced:

 Autumn Break – one week in mid-November
 Spring Break – one week in mid-April

Australia and New Zealand 
In Australia and New Zealand, academic years for primary and secondary institutions are divided into four 10-week 'terms' per year. Although historically the year was divided into three terms with an extended Easter break interrupting the first term, the Australian academic year has been divided into four terms since the late 1980s (with the exception of Tasmania which did not change until 2013); New Zealand adopted a four-term year in 1996.

Following southern hemisphere seasons, the main summer holiday between academic years encompasses most of December, all of January and sometimes a few days at the beginning of February, and always encompasses Christmas and New Year as well as usually Australia Day on 26 January. The exact start and finish date of the academic year varies between jurisdictions; in 2023 Queensland will start earliest on 23 January (the only jurisdiction to begin the academic year before Australia Day) and finish earliest on 8 December, while Tasmania will start latest on 8 February and finish latest on 21 December. In year 12, the term ends in November; for those who go on to university, the term usually starts in late February or early March. New Zealand celebrates Waitangi Day on 6 February; the summer holidays in New Zealand may or may not extend as far as that day, depending on the year. In Australia, there is typically a break of two weeks mid-semester (i.e. after Term 1 and after Term 3) and a break of three weeks in the middle of the year, and in New Zealand, a two week break between each term. In the year 2000, due to the 2000 Olympic Games in Sydney, the state of New South Wales extended the break after Term 3 to three weeks, compensating by reducing the break in the middle of the year to two weeks.

Historically, the Term 1 holiday have been scheduled around Easter, reflecting the three-term system's notion of an extended Easter break within Term 1; although since the mid-1990s this has gradually changed, and now only Queensland and Victoria tie the school holidays closely to Easter; the remainder of Australia and all of New Zealand now have a fixed length to Term 1 which leads to the Easter period falling within Term 1 in some years with an early Easter, such as 2016.

Typically, the Term 1 holidays will run for two weeks within April; the mid-year holidays encompass the last week of June and the first two weeks of July; and the Term 3 holidays encompass the last week of September and the first week of October. This varies between jurisdictions, and exact dates depend on what day of the week these respective months begin, as (with the exception of the beginning and end of the academic year), terms tend to begin and end with full weeks.

Europe

Austria
In Austria, the summer holidays are usually between early July and early September. There is, with the exception of Vorarlberg and Salzburg, no Autumn break but there is a Christmas break (from December 24 until January 6) and an Easter break (lasts for 10 days). The mid-term break in February lasts for a week and the Whitsun break lasts for 4 days including the weekend. There are also days off during religious holidays (Assumption, Ascension, Corpus Christi etc.).

Belgium
For primary schools, the academic year in Belgium begins on the first weekday in September and ends on the last weekday in June, with the summer holiday comprising the entire months of July and August. 

Secondary schools and universities often close about a week earlier, as soon as school results have been processed and published. A week of autumn break is usually scheduled during the week of All Saints’ Day (November 1). The winter- or Christmas holiday lasts two weeks and encompasses both Christmas and New Year's Day. The dates for both the one-week spring break and the two-week Easter holiday vary. In catholic regions where carnival is celebrated, spring break usually takes place during the carnival week. To get al balance in school days between spring break and summer holiday, the two weeks of Easter holiday can take place with Easter both at the beginning, the middle or the end of the holiday period. In some cases, when Easter is at the complete end of the holiday, Easter Monday serves as an additional day off. However, in 2008 Belgium did not have the Easter Weekend inside its break due to the fact that Easter Sunday was on 23 March and schools broke up on the first weekend in April 2008 and had the two weeks then.

Croatia
In Croatia, there can be anywhere from three to five major breaks throughout the school year at public schools, depending on the region. Regardless of the number of holidays a school decides to have, a school year must have a minimum of 175 working days, or 160 for students undertaking the final exam at the end of high school.

 Summer break runs from mid-June (typically the 15th/16th) to early September (usually the first Monday in September), usually lasting for 11 weeks.
 Winter (Christmas) break usually starts on December 24 (Christmas Eve) and ends in the first Monday after January 6. It lasts for 3 weeks in total. Some parts of the country have opted to split the winter holidays in two parts: the first part lasting for 2 weeks starting on Christmas Eve and encompassing Christmas and New Year, and the second part lasting for one week, usually the last week of February.
 Spring (Easter) break lasts about 10 days, and encompasses Good Friday, Easter, Easter Monday, and the work week after or before Easter.

Some schools have opted to shorten the winter holidays in exchange for an Autumn break, which typically lasts for one week around All Saints' Day (November 1).

Other free days include public holidays and local patron saint days. If these land on a Tuesday or Thursday, the day before (Monday, if the holiday is on Tuesday) of after (Friday, if it's on Thursday), is usually also considered a free day, to "merge" the holiday with the weekend.

Czech Republic
In the Czech Republic, the summer holidays begin at the end of the school year around 30 June and end at the start of the school year on 1 September or soon thereafter. Then there are autumn holidays: two days plus 28 October (the date of the proclamation of Czechoslovakia). The winter (Christmas) holidays last usually from 22 December to 3 January. There is also a one-day half term holiday on 31 January. The spring holidays are a week long and may occur in February or March, depending on the region, sometimes they continue with Easter holidays (Maundy Thursday, Good Friday and Easter Monday). There are also free days such as 1 May (International Workers' Day), 8 May (end of World war two) and 28 September (The assassination of St. Wenceslas - the duke and the patron saint of the Czech lands). The school director is authorised to add up to three more free days during the school year. The school holidays are determined by the Ministry of Schools for each school year and are valid for every basic and high school.

Denmark
In Denmark the summer holiday lasts 6–7 weeks. Most schools also have one week of winter holiday and one week of autumn holiday, usually in February and October respectively. Finally, the schools are closed from just before Christmas until just after New Year.

Estonia
In Estonia, summer holidays last for three months from June to August. Christmas holidays last for two weeks, autumn and spring holidays are each one week. In 2016, the Estonian Ministry of Education decided to add a new holiday, starting from 2017, to balance the learning weeks. There are going to be 5 holidays: Autumn holiday (21- 29 October), Winter Holiday (23 December- 7 January), a new holiday (24 February- 4 March), Spring holiday (21 April- 1 May) and Summer holiday (12 June- 31 August). Summer break starts 1 week later.

France 
French school holidays are scheduled each year by the Ministry of Education. This can lead to overcrowding in tourist resorts such as the Mediterranean coast and the ski resorts.

To alleviate this problem, the holiday schedules are staggered by dividing the country into three zones. Despite these measures, the synchronized school holiday schedules still cause some crowding effects, as families head to popular holiday locations all at the same time. This can result in price increases and availability problems in some locations during the school holiday periods.
Holidays are divided into three separate zones except for the first two holidays: All Saints and the Christmas / New Year.

Germany
In Germany, ~75 week days of the year are school-free days. The exact dates are chosen by each of the 16 states, often in consultation with each other for reasons of planning and traffic management. The usual holiday blocks are: Christmas (~2 weeks), Easter (~2 weeks), Summer (6 weeks), Autumn (~2 weeks). Depending on the state, further holidays can be around Pentecost or in winter between the first and the second half of the school year.

Greece
In Greece, there are three breaks throughout the school year at public schools.
 Summer holidays run from June to September. Holidays begin between June 10 and 20, and end around September 11.
 Christmas holidays begin around December 23 and end around January 8 (about 2 weeks).
 Easter holidays last 2 weeks from Lazarus Saturday to Thomas Sunday (according to the Orthodox calculations)
 There are also three 1-day national holidays: October 28, March 25 and November 17.

Ireland
The dates for the start and the end of the school year at both primary and post-primary level are not fixed, but mid-year breaks are standardised. Due to the start of certificate exams, post-primary schools are usually not open for tuition after the Friday before the June public holiday (the first Monday in June) in any year. Primary schools must be open for a minimum of 182 days of tuition a year and for secondary schools that number is 166.  

First Day of School: The school year generally starts during the last few days of August or first few days of September. Return dates for Secondary schools are usually staggered depending on what year you are in.  

Halloween Break: Schools close for one week at the end of October for the midterm break. This break usually encompasses Halloween (October 31) 

Christmas Break: Schools close for two weeks at Christmas time. Those two weeks always encompass Christmas and New Year. Schools will close no later than December 23rd and reopen no earlier than January 4th. 

Spring Break: Schools close for another week in mid-February for the spring midterm.  

St Patrick's Day: Schools are always shut on March 17 as it is a public holiday. If March 17 falls on a weekend, schools are closed on the Monday immediately following. Some schools may tend to take an extra day or two to extend this break. For example if March 17 is a Thursday, schools will close on the Friday, and Monday following to make it a five day break.   

Easter Break: Schools close for two weeks for Easter. Schools generally close for Easter break on the Friday one week before Good Friday, and reopen on the Monday one week after Easter Monday. 

May/June Break: Some primary schools may take another week off in May or June, if they have not taken a full week off in February. 

Summer Holidays: Secondary schools generally finish for summer on the first Friday of June or the last Friday of May. Exam years will sit 1-3 weeks of State Exams during June. 

Primary schools will generally finish on 30 June, or the last friday of June for summer break.

Italy
In Italy, most school holidays are determined by the Ministry of Education, and are valid for all public schools of every order and grade. There are Summer holidays from mid-June up to the second week of September, except for students taking final exams in Middle and Superior schools, as those exams can go on until mid-July. Christmas (Winter) holidays start on December 23 and end on the first or second working day after January 6; the summer holidays in Italy about 12 weeks, other holidays include one week around Easter (Spring) as well as one day on December 8 (Feast of the Immaculate Conception), one day for November 1 (All Saints (Autumn)), the national holidays of April 25 (Liberation day) and June 2 (Republic Day), as well as the Workers' Day (May 1). Locally, school authorities have freedom upon the establishment of the lessons calendar to grant further vacation days on important local festivals (e.g. the local patron saint day).

Latvia
In Latvia, summer holidays last for three months from June to August. Christmas holidays last for two weeks, autumn and spring holidays are each one week.

Lithuania
In Lithuania summer holiday for 9th and 11th grade begins a few days later than 10th and 12th grade students. This is due to exams for those grades. In the past, upper level Lithuanian students had around 70 days of holiday. However, now the holiday lasts almost three months.

The Netherlands
In the Netherlands, summer holidays last for six weeks for all Schools, but often unofficially 7 for secondary schools. The country is divided into three regions which start their summer holidays one week after another. Summer holidays usually start in mid-July and end in late August. Dutch elementary and high school students also have a one-week autumn holiday in mid-October, two weeks of Christmas holidays, usually the last two weeks of December, as well as one week "crocus/spring holidays" in February (for the south during Carnaval), and "May holidays", which last one or two week(s) for high schools and for elementary schools (This may differ from school to school). May holidays span a period of national holidays such as King's Day (former Queen's Day) (April 27), Remembrance of the Dead (May 4) and Liberation Day (May 5) and sometimes include Ascension Day and Pentecost.

North Macedonia
In North Macedonia, there are two breaks throughout the school year at public schools.
 Summer break usually runs from June 10 to September 1.
 Winter (Christmas) break starts after New Year's Eve (January 1) and ends usually after January 20.
Other free days include the public holidays and local or School patron days.

Norway
In Norway, school holidays vary by region. Generally, the school year starts around the third week of August. Most regions have a week off at the beginning of October (weeks 40 or 41). Christmas holidays start some days before Christmas Eve and end in the first week of January. There is one week of winter vacation in late February (weeks 8 or 9). Easter holiday is from Palm Sunday to Easter Monday or a day or two later, and Summer holidays begin some days before midsummer.

Poland
All public schools have the following breaks/holidays (with the 5 main breaks underlined):

 November 1 – All Saints Day, 1 day break
 November 11 – Independence Day (Autumn), 1 day break
 January 6 – the Epiphany, 1 day break
 1st Winter Break – Two weeks around Christmas and New Year
 2nd Winter Break – two weeks in January or February (depending on region)
 Easter (Spring) Break – Maundy Thursday to the Tuesday after Easter Monday
 May Break – May 1 (Labor Day), May 2 (Polish Flag Day) and May 3 (Constitution of May 3)
 Corpus Christi – four days in May or June (depending on the year)
 Summer Break – first Saturday after June 20 to the end of August or early September (first school week day in September unless it falls on a Friday)

Romania
Summer breaks run from late May-mid-June to early-mid-September and are around 13–15 weeks long. Pupils/students in the 8th and 12th grades usually enter summer break a week or two earlier than everyone else from other grades.

Spring breaks are usually one to two weeks long, between late March and early May depending on the dates of both Orthodox and Catholic Easter. There can be two spring breaks if the Catholic and Orthodox Easter dates are very different. 

Winter break is three weeks long (it usually starts in the third or fourth week of December and it ends on the second or third Monday of January).

There is also a one-week long fall break, which is usually between late October and early November; however, it was limited to pupils in 
preschool and primary education; everyone else had a full learning period between the summer and winter breaks. Starting from 2022, though, the fall break has been applied to middle and high schools, too.

All academic years in Romania prior to the 2019–2020 school year used to have a second Winter break, which was often referred to as the "break between semesters" (vacanță intersemestrială), which would usually be in early February and have a duration of one-week, between the first and second semesters. From the 2019–2020 school year onwards (with the exception of the 2020–2021 school year), the start of the winter break marks the end of the first semester, with the beginning of the second semester immediately after the winter break. From 2022-2023, there is a break in February (however, this isn't between semesters), and the counties can decide each which week of February.

Russian Federation
All public schools have the following holidays:

 Winter Break – a week or two in January
 Spring Break – one week in late March to early April 
 Fall Break – one week in late October to early November
 Summer Break – from late May to August 31
 February 23 – Men's Day or Defender's Day
 March 8 – International Women's Day
 May 1 – Spring and Labour Day
 May 9 – Victory Day
 November 4 – Unity Day

Slovakia
In Slovakia, summer holidays begin at the end of the school year on June 30 and end at the start of the school year in early September. The autumn holidays are at the end of October. The winter (Christmas) holidays usually last from December 23 to January 7. There is also a one-day half term holiday on January 31. The spring holidays are a week long and may be in February or March, depending on the region. Next are the Easter holidays (Maundy Thursday, Good Friday, Easter Monday and Easter Tuesday). There are also free days such as May 1, May 8, September 1, September 15, and November 17. The school director is authorized to add up to three more free days during the school year. The school holidays are determined by the Ministry of Schools and are valid for every basic and high school.

Slovenia 
In Slovenia, summer holidays begin on June 24 (June 25 is National day, which is also a public holiday) and end on September 1. Other holidays are usually one week long, they expand if national holidays fall on the work days. The autumn holidays ("Krompirjeve počitnice" – "Potato holidays") begin around October 31, which is Reformation day and November 1 which is called "All Saints' Day". The New Year holidays usually start around Christmas and last until January 2. In the middle of February there are winter holidays, which are divided into two parts. In each part there are other Slovenian students who have holidays. The second part of the winter holiday usually ends at the end of February. The shortest holidays are First May holidays, and as their name suggests they begin on around May 1 (usually on April 27, which is Uprising Against the Occupation Day, which is also a national holiday) and last until May 2, which is also a national holiday. There are also free days such as February 8 (Slovenian cultural festival – Prešeren Day) and Easter Monday, and other national holidays like August 15 (Feast of the Assumption) fall on school holidays and are more important to adults. Students from the last year of primary and secondary schools usually start summer holidays one week earlier due to the final exams. These holidays are valid for primary and secondary schools only and are determined by the Ministry of Schools. University students, however, have summer holidays until October 1, however the exams from spring examination period can be after 25 June and the summer examination period starts in September. Usually students have only one other holiday and that is the New Year holiday but it depends on every single college which days will be free for students. For example, in 2015, most university students also had First May holidays. Short holidays usually begin after exams and depend on how good students are at their exams or how many exams they have taken for each term. Most of the time, university students have holidays on national holidays.

Sweden
In Sweden, the school year starts around mid- or late August (September 1 at the universities). The week before All Saint's Day (taken as a Saturday around November 2) primary and secondary school students have an autumn holiday. Christmas holiday starts around December 19–20, depending on the day of the week on which Christmas Eve occurs. It usually ends some days after January 6, which is also a public holiday. In March, primary and secondary school students have one week of winter vacation; the exact week varies by location. Easter public holidays last four days from Friday to Monday. Easter school holidays are either the week preceding Easter or the week immediately following, depending on location. Primary and secondary school summer holidays last about ten weeks, starting in the second week of June.

United Kingdom
School holidays in the United Kingdom follow a standard pattern, with a school year of 190 days of teaching, beginning with the Autumn Term, but the exact timing varies between countries and counties. Local authorities set term dates which apply to all Community, Voluntary Controlled, Community Special Schools and Maintained Nursery Schools. Academies, Free schools, Voluntary Aided schools and Foundation schools are able to choose their own dates but many follow the same dates as the Local Authority. Although these schools can set their own term dates, they are still required to open for the same length of time. Independent private schools tend to set longer holidays than state schools.

In England and Wales, the academic year usually runs from the first week of September of one year through to the third week of July of the following year, with the time split up into three terms. Each of these is usually divided into halves with a week-long "half-term" break between. Primary (4-11) and secondary (11–16) schools usually follow a 39-week academic year, while further (16+) and higher (18+) educational establishments often have 33 or even 36-week terms, generally with no half-term break. Oxford and Cambridge universities have shorter terms still, usually eight weeks each term.

For English state schools, the year commences the first week of September with a half-term break (one week) at the end of October, and the first term ending the third week of December. After a two-week holiday, encompassing Christmas and New Year, the second term runs from early January to Easter and is of variable length to allow for the movable feast. There is a half-term break around mid-February and two weeks of the Easter holidays, before the third and final term starts, lasting until the third week of July. The half-term break is at the end of May and students with exams will often finish their studies at that break and take exams during June and July.

The summer holidays last for approximately six weeks, which was for a long time thought to be in order to allow children to help with the harvest. However, as the harvest usually takes place in late September this makes little sense. The six week break was to allow the middle-classes to take longer holidays. In Scotland, the summer break is earlier because of the different day lengths and agricultural practices there.

Private schools may follow different terms, and some self-governing academies follow different termly structures.

England and Wales
Summer holidays in State schools are usually between five and seven weeks long, starting in mid-late July and ending in early September. Schools have Christmas and Easter holidays, each usually lasting about two weeks. The school year is split up into three sections: Autumn term (between Summer and Christmas); Spring term (between Christmas and Easter); and Summer term (between Easter and the Summer holiday). Roughly half-way through each term, pupils will get one week off school, known as half-term. In the Autumn term, half-term often falls the week of Halloween and close to Bonfire Night. In the Spring term, half-term tends to fall the week of Valentine's Day. In the Summer term, half-term tends to be at the end of May with students returning the first Monday of June.

Independent schools often have longer holidays including up to 10 weeks for Summer, but often have longer school days and sometimes lessons on Saturday mornings.

See School Holidays in England for the impact of school holidays on tourism and life for parents and others.

Scotland
In Scotland the academic year usually begins in the third week of August. In October, there are one or two weeks off, which is the half-way point between Summer and Christmas holidays. The Christmas holiday usually begins a few days before December 25 and ends a few days after January 5. There is up to a week off half-way through the Spring term and a two-week break for Easter. After Easter is Summer term and the 3rd half term break is the half-way point to the summer holidays. The summer holiday usually begins at the end of June for most pupils in primary 1–7 and secondary years 1–3. Years 4, 5, and 6 have a period of exam leave at the end of April until early June, but may return for the last few weeks before the summer holiday starts. It's usually 7–8 weeks.

Northern Ireland
Schools in Northern Ireland have similar school holidays to those in the Republic of Ireland. Schools in Northern Ireland have shorter mid-term breaks than those in the rest of the UK and, to substitute, a longer summer holiday that includes the whole month of July and August.

See also
Academic term

References

Academic terminology
Types of year